Werner Rudolf Breslauer (4 July 1903 – 28 February 1945) was a German photographer of Jewish descent.

Leipzig, the Netherlands, Westerbork, Auschwitz 

Breslauer was born in Leipzig, where he was trained as a photographer and as a printer. In 1938, he fled to the Netherlands, where he lived and worked in Leiden, Alphen and Utrecht. In 1942, Breslauer, his wife Bella Weissmann, sons Mischa and Stefan and daughter Ursula were imprisoned and deported to Westerbork transit camp. 
Camp commander  ordered Breslauer to make photographs and films of life in Westerbork. Breslauer and his family were transported to Auschwitz in the autumn of 1944. His wife and two sons were immediately killed, Rudolf Breslauer died a few months later. Their daughter Ursula survived the war.

Photographs, stills and a film from Westerbork, by Breslauer 
The German camp commander, Albert Gemmeker ordered Breslauer to document everyday life in the Westerbork transit camp. In 2017, these films were submitted by the Netherlands and included in UNESCO's Memory of the World Register.

References

External links 
 
 The Westerbork movie by Rudolf Breslauer in 1944. NPO-Geschiedenis, May 2011 (Four short movies and two films with loose footage)
 Holocaust Encyclopaedia: Westerbork

1903 births
1945 deaths
German people who died in Auschwitz concentration camp
German Jews who died in the Holocaust
Jewish emigrants from Nazi Germany to the Netherlands
Photographers from Leipzig
Articles containing video clips
Jewish artists